The AeroLites Bearcat is an American amateur-built aircraft, designed and produced by AeroLites, of Welsh, Louisiana and introduced in 1984. The aircraft is supplied as a kit for amateur construction.

Design and development
The Bearcat features a strut-braced parasol-wing, a single-seat open cockpit, fixed conventional landing gear and a single engine in tractor configuration.

The aircraft fuselage is made from welded 4130 steel tubing with the wing constructed with an aluminum structure, with its flying surfaces covered in Dacron sailcloth. The ribs slide into pockets in the fabric. Standard engines available are the  Rotax 447, the  Rotax 503 and the  Rotax 582 two-stroke powerplants. Equipment to convert the aircraft for aerial application is also available.

The manufacturer claims that the supplied kit takes 60–90 hours to assemble.

Operational history
By 1998 the company had reported that nine Bearcats and two Ag Bearcats were flying.

Variants
Bearcat
Base model
Ag Bearcat
Model equipped as an agricultural aircraft, originally equipped with a  Rotax 532 engine.

Specifications (Bearcat)

References

External links

Homebuilt aircraft
Single-engined tractor aircraft
Bearcat